Allama Iqbal Medical College is a public medical school in Lahore, widely regarded as one of the best medical institutions in Pakistan. Established in 1975, it is a public school of medicine, nursing and allied health sciences located in Lahore, Punjab, Pakistan. Jinnah hospital is attached to the college as a teaching hospital, which is housed adjacent to the college complex.

History
The Government of Pakistan's initiative in the mid-seventies to establish new seats of learning to spur medical education and research in Pakistan led to the establishment of this institution on 2 May 1975 as Lahore Medical College.

Akhtar Hussain Awan was the first principal. Muhammad Afzal Sheikh was the first Professor of Anatomy, while Mahmood Ali Malik and Abdul Ghaffar laid the framework of the physiology department. Sanaullah was the first administrative officer.

On 12 August 1975, a batch of 313 students began their first academic day. Two years later, the college was renamed Allama Iqbal Medical College to commemorate the centenary celebrations of Allama Muhammad Iqbal.

Initially the college was housed temporarily in a borrowed, and wholly inadequate building with meagre audiovisual teaching aids and facilities at the Post-Graduate Medical Institute, Lahore. The space was so limited that two shifts of teaching and practical classes were held to accommodate all the students.

Meanwhile, in 1980, the final plan for Allama Iqbal Medical College Complex was agreed upon and its foundation stone was laid in March 1980. With a budget of Rs. 670 million, of which Rs. 370 million were for the building and Rs. 300 million were for the equipment, the work on the construction of the campus started. The college complex was inaugurated by then President of Pakistan, Ghulam Ishaq Khan on 18 May 1989. The work on 1100-bedded Jinnah Hospital started in 1988.

Initially, the Services Hospital, Lahore was affiliated as a teaching hospital with AIMC, but once the college moved to its present campus in 1990, Jinnah Hospital was built as a dedicated teaching hospital. The hospital started functioning in 1994 when the out patient department was opened. Soon the departments of Radiology, Radiotherapy and Pathology were functional as well. The emergency and casualty department was opened to the public on 23 March 1995 and the Diabetes Clinic was started on 28 May 1995.

Former principals

 A. H. Awan
 Ijaz Ahsan
 Iftikhar Ahmad
 S.A.R Gardezi
 Iqbal Rasheed Mian
 Munawar Hayat
 Naseer Mehmood Akhtar
 Mehmood Ali Malik
 Riaz Ehsan Siddique
 Eice Muhammad
 Khalil ur Rehman
 Eice Muhammad
 Sibt-ul-Hasnain Syed
 Javed Akram
 Mahmood Shaukat
 Muhammad Rashid Zia

Current principal: Arif Tajammal

Campus
Allama Iqbal Medical College has only one campus which is spread over 100 acres situated on the Canal Road. The campus consists of the basic science departments, administrative block, library, fountain pavilion, lecture theatre complex, and cafeteria. It provides a residential facility for 1000 medical students, 200 internees, 500 nurses and a colony comprising 200 houses for the employees.

For the purpose of extra- and co-curricular activities, a sports complex including separate gymnasiums for boys and girls, a swimming pool, tennis courts, hockey and cricket grounds, and an auditorium with a seating capacity of 1500 have also been built.

Facilities

Library 
The library complex possesses a hall and provides various learning resources for the faculty and the teachers. There are two main sections of the library: the main hall and the internet facility next to the office of the chief librarian. The main hall houses a collection of 28,000 books and various journals. Most of the books and journals are related to medicine and allied fields and are written by authors of international repute.  The library subscribes to 14 international medical journals and 20 national medical journals. Apart from the medical books, the library has a collection of encyclopedias, dictionaries, Islamic encyclopedias, English and Urdu novels and poetry. The Internet facility is the newest addition to the library complex.

Auditorium 

An auditorium is present next to the administration department, with the façade on the library side. With tiered seating, the auditorium holds an audience of 1000. A weekly clinicopathological conference, most of the scientific meetings, seminars & symposia and important lectures and addresses take place in this building. During the sports week it is the site for all the literary events and Annual Interclass Skit Competitions.

Hostels 
Arranged in the form of a red rose with four petals, four male hostels and three female hostels are present at the canal end of the college encircling a green square. There are three male students and one male doctors' hostel. The student hostels are named after the legendary Muslim scholars Ibn Nafees, Al Beruni and Bu Ali Sina. Each student hostel has two wings, three floors, a mess, and a TV lounge for students of different classes. The doctors' hostel also has two wings, two floors, and houses some of the important faculty members.

Just a few minutes walk from the male hostel area behind the oval college grounds are two girls' hostels and one nursing hostel. On average, there are 112 rooms in each hostel with rooms ranging from cubical, twin, and four-bed. The hostel facilities can accommodate 1,000 students, 400 nurses, and 100 internees.

Each hostel is looked after by an assistant warden. Many aspects of life in the hostels are managed by the students themselves such as the boarding arrangements. The hostels are provided with common rooms, canteens, prayer rooms, and other common utilities.

Research
Students of Allama Iqbal Medical College work within three recognized departments of the college, namely, biochemistry, pathology, and medicine in research fields. The college has just announced its tri-monthly journal of research called AIJE.

Recognition and affiliations
The college is recognized by the following organizations:
 Higher Education Commission
Pakistan Medical and Dental Council
 College of Physiotherapists, Mayo Hospital Lahore
 Riphah College of Orthopedic Surgeons and Rehabilitation Sciences
 University of Lahore, Lahore
University of Health Sciences, Lahore

Other affiliations include the International Network for Cancer Treatment and Research, School Of Allied Health Sciences

Student life

Current and former students
The current and former students of Allama Iqbal Medical College are referred to as Iqbalians.

Student unions
The first Students Union Election was held in 1979. President; Mansour Ahmad Khan, General Secretary; Muhammad Ashraf Chouhan. The second Students Union Election was held in 1980. President; Muhammad Amjad Cheema, General Secretary; Akhtar Rashid

Publications
 Allama Iqbal Medical College has its annual college magazine, Shaheen, maintained by students. Ijaz Ahmade.

Alumni
 Allama Iqbal Medical College Alumni Association of North America

See also
Jinnah Hospital
Services Institute of Medical Sciences, Lahore
List of medical schools in Pakistan

References

External links
 Allam Iqbal Medical College, Lahore - official website Archived

Medical colleges in Punjab, Pakistan
Universities and colleges in Lahore
Academic institutions in Pakistan
Memorials to Muhammad Iqbal
Postgraduate schools in Pakistan